Mohsen Vaziri Moghaddam (27 July 1924 – 7 September 2018), was an Iranian-born painter, sculptor, and a professor of art. He has been described as the "pioneer of modern Iranian abstraction."

Life and education 
Mohsen Vaziri was born on 27 July 1924 in Tehran, Qajar Iran.

In 1943, after obtaining his diploma at the Agricultural Institute, he applied to the Faculty of Fine Arts at Tehran University (now University of Tehran) and he attended for three years. During his years at university, he felt the influence of impressionism and post-impressionism, especially Van Gogh, in both subject matters and expressive forms.

Career 
In 1952, his first solo exhibition was held at the Iran-America Society in Tehran.

From 1955 to 1958, Vaziri left for Rome, where he studied at the Academy of Fine Arts. During these years, coinciding with the birth of European Informalism and the American Action Painting, after studying and analyzing new modern art movements. In the April of 1956, Vaziri had his first Italian exhibition, displaying his figurative paintings at the Portonovo Art Gallery in Rome. In the same year, he exhibited in Düsseldorf and Munich in Germany.

In 1957, a landmark year and a turning point in his artistic career, he attended Toti Scialoja’s classes at the Academy for six months and started experimenting with abstract art.  

Vaziri bonded and shared his path with now internationally-known artists who also attended Scialoja’s course (Pino Pascali, Jannis Kounellis, Mohamed Melehi, Maria Pioppi, Mario Ceroli and amongst many others). They embraced the vibrant artistic and intellectual zeitgeist, a meeting via di Ripetta and Piazza del Popolo in Rome –“our Latin Quarter” as described by film director Mario Ricci.

His first abstract works date back to 1956-1959, and they fit in perfectly with the search for materials and brushstrokes happening in contemporary movements. 

Between 1959 and 1960, he developed a vision of abstract art through experiments highly focused on materials. This led to the creation of some of his most powerful works: the sand paintings. These paintings were conceived in a playful moment in the spring of 1959, and Vaziri kept trying his hand at them for the following 3 years until 1963.

Different types of sand were applied to the canvas in their natural state or mixed with color. This original concept grabbed the attention of Italian art critic Giulio Carlo Argan and Palma Bucarelli, director of the National Gallery of Modern Art in Rome.

After a long stint in Italy, he returned to Iran, where he taught for several years (until 1978), at the Faculty of Decorative Arts (the current University of Art) and the Faculty of Fine Arts in Tehran. In those years, he wrote two art methodology textbooks still among the most studied by Iranian art students today: Drawing method vol. 1 (1974) and Drawing method vol. 2 (1981). He translated several art books on Paul Klee, German Expressionism, Venetian craftsmanship and 20th century painting from English, French and Italian into Farsi.

The return to Iran and heavy teaching commitments kept Vaziri away from painting for almost one year.

In 1965 Vaziri was at the peak of his artistic career that coincided with the acquisition of one of his paintings by the Modern Art Museum (MoMA) in New York.

In 1967 he started working on a series of reliefs made of aluminium and iron sheets and was still anchored to a mono-dimensional approach.

"As time went past, I drew my five fingerprints with a precise geometric shape, on a colourful background, I cut these shapes and freed them. The reliefs series is the result of my sand paintings. At that time, I gave a lot of thought to structural space, to the discipline of shapes and rhythm deliberately taken from the repetition of arches and roofs in village houses in the desert”.

In 1968, Vaziri moved to the Cité des Arts in Paris, thanks to a grant, and he continued developing his work with aluminium and ondulated pieces of wood. That same year, his works were presented at Royan International Festival and exhibited at the national TV headquarters.

Once he returned to Iran that same year, he started making his articulated sculptures­ – open and interactive artworks which encouraged the viewer’s participation.

“These sculptures possess elongated, and serrated wooden parts attached to their middle bases through joints which could be manipulated and moved. In Vaziri’s own words, “they would open and close just like human joints”. According to the artist, the idea of these moving parts occurred while making and cutting pieces for the fixed sculptures. These earlier, immobile sculptures were actually devised from intersecting a few shaped, colorful flat plates, like fragments of a paintings.” (Darabi, 2021)

During the 1970s, these sculptures would in turn inspire a series of paintings entitled Fear and Flight that marked a return to the well-defined shapes (both pointed and rounded) of his tri-dimensional works and developed them further. Alberto Moravia and Pierre Restany are amongst the eminent art critics that wrote about his work.

A constant and essential theme in his work–whether in painting or sculpture–was that of space, which led to results much appreciated by critics (Argan, Moravia, Bevilacqua, Menna, Pensabene) and to a recognition awarded by the City of Rome (1958), Prime Minister Segni (International Art Competition, Ravenna 1959) and the Senate Gold Medal (Sassoferrato 1962).

His works have been shown in numerous solo exhibitions in Italy (Rome, Milan, Florence), Germany (Dusseldorf, Munich), and Iran, at the Venice Biennial (1956, 1958, 1960, 1962), at the Tehran Biennial (1960, 1962), at the Rome Quadriennale (1960), at the Sao Paulo Biennial in Brazil (1963), at the Museum of Modern Art, New York (1964) and at the Shiraz Art Festival, Iran (1969).

In 1985 Vaziri decided to return to Rome, the beloved city of his artistic training and development, with his wife and two children. 

In the 1990s the artist worked on Persian calligraphy shapes, trying to point out the minimalism of its lines. He also continued to test himself with abstract compositions that were all different from each other and characterised by either highly defined shapes and intense colours or vague silhouettes and soft pastel colours. 

In 1999 his Farsi translation of The Mind and Work of Paul Klee by W. Hahtmann was published; he resumed contact with Iranian universities and held several lectures.

In 2003 Vaziri was affected by an eye disease, that would considerably reduce his eyesight, but he didn’t let this dampen his spirit. On the contrary, he resumed one of his previous techniques from the end of the 1950s, using large splashes of colour that reflected his way of seeing reality.

In 2004, he exhibited at the major solo “Fourth Exhibition. Pioneers of Iranian Modern Art: Mohsen Vaziri Moghaddam”, at Tehran Museum of Contemporary Art, also featuring works by Gerhard Richter.

On this occasion, Vaziri was hailed and officially awarded as the “best Iranian artist of the century”.

In 2013 one of his sculptures (Forms in Movement) and the sand painting that is part of the MoMA collection were exhibited at the “Iran Modern” exhibition, a major retrospective on Iranian dynamic modern art, held at the Asia Society Museum in New York.

In 2014, the same sculpture was exhibited at the contemporary art exhibition “Artevida corpo” at the Fundação Casa França-Brasil, in Rio de Janeiro, Brazil.

In 2017, the Mohsen Vaziri Moghaddam Foundation was created in Rome following the wish of the artist and his sons. Its goal is to increase the public’s awareness and enhance the understanding of Vaziri’s visual arts, promoting and protecting the artworks through the archive and publication of a catalogue raisonné.

In 2017 the Foundation organized its first happening in the industrial area of Ex Dogana in Rome. On this occasion the artist made a large-size sand artwork across 20 canvases.

In 2021 a major exhibition on Vaziri’s articulated wooden and plexiglass sculptures "Mohsen Vaziri Moghaddam. Unrealised Projects. Dynamic Sculptures from Small to Monumental 1968-2018” was held at Argo Factory, with the support of the Italian Embassy in Tehran. 

The exhibition offered a continuous dialogue between original sculptures and new reproductions, so that visitors had the opportunity to interact with the artwork, tightening and loosening bolts with a wrench, just like Vaziri used to encourage visitors to do in his exhibitions. 

One of Vaziri’s aluminium artwork (“Untitled 1968/2015”) from 1960s is currently on display as part of the touring exhibition “The Dynamic Eye: Op and Kinetic Art” organized by Tate Modern and Pudong Museum of Art, Shanghai. 

His works are held in the public collections of museums by the Museum of Modern Art; the Parviz Tanavoli Museum, and the Tehran Museum of Contemporary Art.

Notable exhibitions 
 1952: (debut solo exhibition), Iran-America Society, Tehran
 1956: Portonovo Art Gallery, Rome
 1958: Venice Biennial
 1960: Tehran Biennial
 1960  Venice Biennial (1958, 1960, 1962, 1964)
 1950: Rome Quadriennale
 1962: Tehran Biennial
 1962: Venice Biennial (1958, 1960, 1962, 1964)
 1962: São Paulo Biennial, Brazil (1962)
 1963: (group exhibition), São Paulo Biennial, Brazil   
 1964: Museum of Modern Art, New York
 1964: Venice Biennial
 1969: Shiraz Arts Festival, Iran
 2004: Contemporary Art Museum, Tehran (with Gerhard Richter)
 2009: Pioneers of Modern Iranian Art, Tehran 
 2011: Pioneers of Modern Iranian Art, Tehran 
 2013: Iran Modern Exhibition (group exhibition; first major exhibition of post-war Iranian art)
 2014: Artevida Corpo (travelling exhibition at venues throughout Rio de Janeiro), Fundação Casa França-Brasil, Rio de Janeiro, Brazil
 2018: Mohsen Vaziri Moghaddam: The Iranian Pioneer of Modern Abstraction, Setareh Gallery, Duselldorf
 2018: Modernism in Iran: 1958–1978, (group exhibition)

See also
 Islamic art
 Iranian art
 List of Iranian artists
List of Iranian painters

References

Further reading
 Hassan Mourizi Nejad, “Iranian Modern Artists: Mohsen Vaziri-Moghaddam,” Tandis, no. 71, April 11, 2006. pp. 4–7

External links 
 Official website

Iranian painters
People from Tehran
University of Tehran alumni
Academic staff of the University of Tehran
1924 births
Iranian art writers
2018 deaths